The Wiegand River is a river in Thunder Bay District in Northwestern Ontario, Canada. It is in the Great Lakes Basin and is a right tributary of the Matawin River.

The river begins at Adrian Lake in geographic AdrianTownship, and heads northwest. It turns northeast, enters geographic Horne Township, and reaches its mouth at the Matawin River. The Matawin River flows via the Kaministiquia River to Lake Superior.

See also
List of rivers of Ontario

References

Sources

Rivers of Thunder Bay District